The Age of Consent is the debut album by synth-pop band Bronski Beat (Steve Bronski, Larry Steinbachek and Jimmy Somerville), released on London Records on 15 October 1984. This was the only album released by the band to feature Somerville, who departed the band in 1985.

A re-recorded and expanded version was released in 2017 under the name of "The Age of Reason", with Bronski, Ian Donaldson, and new singer Stephen Granville.

Background

By 1984, many European countries had reduced the age of consent for homosexual acts to 16, but it remained at 21 in the United Kingdom, having only been partially decriminalised in 1967. Homosexuality was not ‘legalised’ in Scotland, where Somerville was born, until 1981. The wording of the legislation to decriminalise also included wording that placed restrictions such as making illegal the use of a hotel room for sex. Homosexuality was further stigmatised beyond the restrictions placed on homosexual individuals, and homophobia was a danger to gay individuals.

Against this background, Bronski, Steinbachek, and Somerville met in Brixton in 1983, and soon formed Bronski Beat. They signed a recording contract with London Records in 1984 after doing only nine live gigs.

The album was produced by Mike Thorne; the recording sessions took place in London and New York City. The first single, "Smalltown Boy", was recorded at The Garden studio (owned by former Ultravox singer John Foxx) and mixed at Maison Rouge studio, both of them based in London.

The song "Heatwave" features the tap-dancing rhythms of Caroline O'Connor.

The inner sleeve of the album has a table listing the minimum age for lawful homosexual relationships between men in each country in Europe, accompanied by the telephone number of a service giving gay legal advice. It was removed from the United States release of the album by MCA Records on the basis of "past sensitivities of several record store chains".

Singles
The album produced four hit singles.

"Smalltown Boy"

The band's debut single was released in June 1984, peaking at number 3 in the UK singles chart in June, and reaching number one in Belgium, Italy, and the Netherlands. It is a poetically poignant, soul searching composition addressing homophobia, loneliness and family misunderstanding. It has been described as perfectly encapsulating "the experience of being young and gay in the '80s".

It was accompanied by a video of Jimmy Somerville with fellow band member friends Larry Steinbachek and Steve Bronski, who, while cruising at a public swimming pool and changing room, are attacked and beaten up by a gang of homophobes. Somerville is returned to his family by the police; he leaves home alone and has a reunion with friends Steinbachek and Bronski, travelling to a new life on a train.

The band had the telephone number of the London Gay Switchboard (telephone support and information for gays and lesbians in central London) etched into the inner groove of the 12" vinyl version.

Additional congas were played by John Folarin. Sleeve cover art was by Gill Whisson.

"Why?"

The follow-up single "Why?" (recorded at RPM Studios, NYC and mixed at Townhouse Studio, London) pursued a more energetic musical formula, while the lyrics focused more centrally and darkly on anti-gay prejudice. The song opened with a questioning vocal by Somerville and the shattering of breaking glass. Released in September 1984, the single made the top 10 in the UK.

The promotional video opens with Steinbachek and Bronski buying artificial bombs and a small statue of Michelangelo's David in a mad supermarket. At the checkout, because they are openly gay, the assistant telephones the management to enquire whether they can pay for the items. They are refused. Meanwhile, Jimmy is singing behind a counter of sausages and salamis and, seeing the dilemma in progress, starts complaining to the checkout girl. All three are arrested by "the thought police" and made to appear for trial before a puppet court and senile judge (Jimmy's father in "Smalltown Boy") The band members are sent to a workhouse. From the workhouse, Jimmy rises up into the air and confronts "God". The workers revolt, and strip the thought police of authority and clothing. The band members are placed on pedestals, before "God" transforms all three of them into statues of salt for their alleged sins.

The thought-police actors who arrest the trio are the swimmer / homophobic gang-leader from the "Smalltown Boy" video and "Martin", a friend of the band whose situation in a gay relationship with a younger man actually inspired the lyrical content of the song. The video extras were mostly friends of the band; they went on strike during the video shoot, due to the excess labour endured by them in the production.

The "Smalltown Boy" and "Why?" videos were directed by Bernard Rose, who also directed the original video for Frankie Goes to Hollywood's "Relax".

The song is dedicated to the memory of playwright Drew Griffiths, a victim of a homophobic murder in 1984.

The sleeve cover art was by Robert McAulay.

"It Ain't Necessarily So"

The third single "It Ain't Necessarily So", the George and Ira Gershwin/ DuBose Heyward song (from the opera Porgy and Bess) that expresses opposition to biblical literalism, was released in November 1984 and reached the UK Top 20. The track featured Arno Hecht from The Uptown Horns on solo clarinet and the openly gay male choir from London, The Pink Singers. It was recorded at The Garden studio, London and Skyline Studios, NYC.

The promotional video featured Jimmy and Larry as inmates in a borstal with Jimmy and "Martin" (the "thought police" actor from "Why?") having a Christmas pie-eating competition which takes place during the Christmas religious service, which Jimmy wins. Steve plays a closeted prison warden who has a keen eye for one of the other prisoners.

The cover sleeve art was a parody of The Wizard Of Oz with Dorothy having the head of the devil.

"I Feel Love (Medley)"

A fourth (and final) single was released before Jimmy Somerville left the band in 1985: a medley of "I Feel Love / Johnny Remember Me / Love To Love You Baby".

A version of the medley had already appeared on the "Age of Consent" album, combining Donna Summer's seminal disco classic "I Feel Love" with John Leyton's "Johnny Remember Me", which had topped the UK charts in 1961. For its single release, former Soft Cell  singer Marc Almond was enlisted to duet with Jimmy Somerville, and another Donna Summer disco song, "Love to Love You Baby", was added as the intro and coda. The single also featured a new backing track that was more synthpop-oriented and catchy than the original album version. As with the band's previous single, the choir providing backing vocals was The Pink Singers. Cellos were played by Beverly Lauridsen, Jesse Levy and Mark Shuman.

"I Feel Love (Medley)" was released in April 1985, with sleeve cover art by Gill Whisson. It became a big hit in the UK, entering the Top 10 in its second week on chart and peaking at number 3 for two weeks.

Critical reception 

The Village Voices Robert Christgau, in a contemporary review, wrote that "Good politics don't have to be this monochromatic" and criticised the "narrow dynamic range that afflicts so many falsettos, even those with impeccable reasons for singing like women." The album ranked at number 12 in CMJs "Top 20 Most-Played Albums of 1985" list. John Dougan of AllMusic retrospectively described the album's songs as "compelling vignettes about the vagaries of life as a gay man" and The Age of Consent as "simply a great album, period."

Track listing

Personnel
Bronski Beat
 Steve Bronski - keyboards, percussion
 Larry Steinbachek - keyboards, percussion
 Jimmy Somerville - vocals

Additional personnel
Beverly Lauridsen, Jesse Levy, Mark Shuman - cello
The Pink Singers - choir
John Folarin - congas
Horns - Uptown Horns (Crispin Cioe (alto saxophone & solo, "Love And Money"), Arno Hecht (tenor saxophone), Richard Coles (clarinet solo), "It Ain't Necessarily So"), "Hollywood" Paul Litteral (trumpet) and Bob Funk (trombone))
Caroline O'Connor - tap dance
Kevin Glancy - backing vocals
Technical
Recording engineers: Peter Griffiths (London), Carl Beatty (NYC) & Dominick Maita (NYC)
Mixing engineers - Harvey Goldberg and Julian Mendelsohn ("Why?")
Recorded at The Garden (London), Skyline (NYC) & RPM (NYC)
Mixed at Maison Rouge, The Town House and Right Track Recording
Mastered by Jack Skinner (Sterling Sound, NYC) & Arun Chakraverty (The Master Room, London)
Producer - Mike Thorne

Charts

Weekly charts

Year-end charts

Certifications

References

External links
Discogs.com album info
CMJ ranking

Bronski Beat albums
1984 debut albums
London Records albums
Albums produced by Mike Thorne